Sentiment is a 2003 Czech drama film directed by Tomáš Hejtmánek. It stars Jiří Kodet as František Vláčil. The film is based on Hejtmánek's meeting with Vláčil. The film was originally meant to be a documentary that would consist of an interview with Vláčil himself but Vláčil died before the shooting started which led to changes of the film. Preparations of the film started in 1996.

Plot
The film consists mostly of Vláčil's monologue as he talks about his career as a filmmaker. Some actors who appeared in his films also make appearance such as Ivan Palúch, František Velecký or Emma Černá. The film ends when Vláčil dies.

Cast
Jiří Kodet as František Vláčil
 Emma Černá
Jan Kačer
Ivan Palúch
František Velecký

References

External links
 

2003 drama films
2003 films
Czech drama films
2000s Czech-language films
František Vláčil